Vasantha Kumar Hanumaiah Ranganatha (born 16 January 1994) is an Indian badminton player who currently plays in doubles category.

Career
In 2018 he won the Ghana International. In the same year, he also participated at the 2018 Hyderabad Open, 2018 Dutch Open and 2018 Syed Modi International. He also won bronze at the 2018 Bulgarian International and at the 2018 Nepal International.

Achievements

BWF International

References

External links 

Living people
Indian male badminton players
1994 births